The peppered goby (Pariah scotius) is a species of goby native to the waters around the Bahamas and Curaçao where it is mostly found inhabiting sponges, showing a particular affinity for Spheciospongia vesparia.  This species is the only known member of its genus.

References

peppered goby
Fish of the Caribbean
Fauna of the Bahamas
Fauna of Curaçao
peppered goby
Taxa named by James Erwin Böhlke